The 1969–70 DDR-Oberliga was the 21st season of the DDR-Oberliga, the first tier of league football in East Germany.

The league was contested by fourteen teams. FC Carl Zeiss Jena won the championship, the club's last of three East German championships.

Otto Skrowny of BSG Chemie Leipzig was the league's top scorer with 12 goals, the lowest total of any top scorer in the history of the league, while Roland Ducke of FC Carl Zeiss Jena won the seasons East German Footballer of the year award.

The 452 goals scored during the season marked the lowest total in the history of the DDR-Oberliga, as did the 2.48 goal average per game.

On the strength of the 1969–70 title Jena qualified for the 1970–71 European Cup where the club was knocked out by Red Star Belgrade in the quarter finals. Second-placed club FC Vorwärts Berlin qualified for the 1970–71 European Cup Winners' Cup as the seasons FDGB-Pokal winner and was knocked out by PSV Eindhoven in the quarter finals. Third-placed Dynamo Dresden qualified for the 1970–71 Inter-Cities Fairs Cup where it was knocked out in the second round by Leeds United.

The 1969–70 season marked the half-way point for the DDR-Oberliga, with 21 seasons played and another 21 to come. Of the champions of the first 21 seasons only Dynamo Dresden won a championship in the second 21 which were dominated by Dresden, 1. FC Magdeburg and Berliner FC Dynamo.

Table									
The 1969–70 season saw two newly promoted clubs Dynamo Dresden and FC Stahl Eisenhüttenstadt.

Results

References

Sources

External links
 Das Deutsche Fussball Archiv  Historic German league tables

1969-70
1
Ober